República Independente da Banda Mole, or simply ), is a pre-carnival block from Belo Horizonte, Brazil.
It was created in the  neighborhood in 1975.
The block's main tradition is the gender swap: men parades dressed with women's clothes, and women the other way round.

History 

In 1975, a predecessor block named  was extinguished. Some of its members, such as Wellington "Lula" Vanucci, Helvécio "Gaiola" Trotta", Paulo Bonome, and others from the neighborhood founded Banda Mole. The goal was to preserve the culture of street blocks in Belo Horizonte. The block's founding principles were: free of charge, freedom to dress freely, and to have political-social satire.

The first parade happened in 1975 with approximately 100 people. The track started at Lagoinha, and headed towards the city center.

The block had its attendance peak in the 90's, when it had up to 400,000 paraders.

Traditions 

Banda Mole parades in the afternoon every Saturday previous to the carnival week (11 days before the Ash Wednesday). 
The block paraders meet at Goiás st., in front to the Estado de Minas's headquarters. Then it parades up Bahia st., heading towards Savassi, in the city southern region.
Since 2004 the meeting point was changed to the Afonso Pena av.

Different trio elétricos with music bands play along the afternoon. The rhythms are typically samba, axé and marchinha.

References

Brazilian Carnival
Parades in Brazil
Festivals established in 1975